Itten is a Swiss surname. Notable people with the surname include:

Cedric Itten (born 1996), Swiss footballer
Johannes Itten (1888–1967), Swiss expressionist painter, designer, teacher, and writer

Surnames of Swiss origin